Vitebsk Province may refer to one of the following
 Vitebsk Region of Belarus or Byelorussian SSR
 Vitebsk Governorate of Russian Empire
 Vitebsk Province of Pskov Governorate in 1772–1776.